Gradec is the name of three villages in Albania:
Gradec, Gjerbës, in Skrapar municipality, Berat County
Gradec, Qendër Skrapar, in Skrapar municipality, Berat County
Gradec, Shkodër, in Kastrat municipality, Shkodër County